The Feast of Herod refers to the episode in the Gospels following the Beheading of St. John the Baptist, when Salome presents his head to her parents. The account in the Book of Mark describes Herod holding a banquet on his birthday for his high officials and military commanders, and leading men of Galilee. At this banquet, Herod's daughter dances before Herod, who is pleased and offers her anything she asks for in return. The girl asks her mother what she should request, and she is told to demand the head of John the Baptist. Reluctantly, Herod orders the beheading of John, and John's head is delivered to her, at her request, "on a platter."()

Numerous artistic depictions of the event have been made.  Usually the moment shown is the arrival of the head on the platter at the table, carried by Salome. Sometimes the execution itself is shown as a subsidiary scene.  The dance of Salome is less often shown before the 19th century; it became more popular after Oscar Wilde's play Salome of 1891, which invented the term Dance of the Seven Veils.  In the 16th-century, Salome carrying the head, usually with her maid, became a popular subject, usually called Salome with the Head of John the Baptist, led by Titian's depiction of c. 1515, and with different depictions by Caravaggio in London and in Madrid.  Depictions of the main feast include:

The Feast of Herod (Donatello), a bronze relief sculpture by Donatello, c. 1427
Feast of Herod with the Beheading of St John the Baptist, by Bartholomeus Strobel, early 17th century (Prado)
A fresco in the cycle Stories of St. Stephen and St. John the Baptist by Filippo Lippi in Prato Cathedral
The Feast of Herod (Rubens), an oil painting by Peter Paul Rubens, c. 1635
Salome Dancing before Herod, Gustave Moreau, 1876 
Dance of Salome (paintings), a large series of works by Nabil Kanso, 1988-95
The Feast of Herod (Gozzoli), a tempera painting by Benozzo Gozzoli, c. 1461
The Feast of Herod and the Beheading of the Baptist, a tempera painting by an unknown Romagnole painter, c. 1300
Peruzzi Chapel, the third fresco in a series of Scenes from the Life of St John the Baptist by Giotto, c. 1320
The Feast of Herod (Giovanni di Paolo), a tempera painting by Giovanni di Paolo, c. 1453

New Testament content
Christian iconography
John the Baptist in art